Dodda Thimmaiah was an Indian politician. He was elected to the lower House of the Indian Parliament, the Lok Sabha, from the Kolar as a member of the  Indian National Congress.

Early life and background 
Dodda Thimmaiah was born on 16 April 1920 in Hosapalaya of Tumkur District. Shri Thimmaiah was his father.

Dodda Thimmaiah completed his education in B.A., and B.L. from Government Central High School, Government Intermediate College, Bangalore, Maharaja's College, Mysore and Government Law College, Bangalore.

Personal life 
Thimmaiah married Govindamma in 1952. The couple has 1 son and 1 daughter.

Political career 
In 1942, Dodda Thimmaiah started working as a Congress party worker and started actively participating in the 1942 Movement. He was imprisoned and suspended from education for 2 years in B.A. Class. Later in 1947, He was again imprisoned for actively participating in the struggle for responsible Govt in Mysore.

After Independence of India Thimmaiah represented kolar in Lok Sabha (the Lower House of the Indian Parliament) for 2 times from (1952 to 1957) and (1957 to 1962).

Position held

References

External links
Official biographical sketch in Parliament of India website
1920 births

India MPs 1952–1957
India MPs 1957–1962
India MPs 1962–1967
Indian National Congress politicians
Lok Sabha members from Karnataka
Possibly living people
Indian National Congress politicians from Karnataka